Furculattus is a genus of the spider family Salticidae (jumping spiders). Its only species is Furculattus maxillosus. It occurs on the Gazelle Peninsula of New Britain, New Guinea, where it was found in the canopy of rain forests.

Description
Both sexes have unusual "horns" between their posterior eyes. Females reach a body length of almost 3 mm, while males are slightly larger, which is unusual for most spiders.

Relationships
F. maxillosus seems to be related to the genera Chalcolecta, Diolenius, Lystrocteisa, Sobasina, Tarodes, Udvardya and several others.

Name
The genus name is a contraction of furcula and the ending -attus, a common ending for salticid genera.

Footnotes

References
  (2007): The world spider catalog, version 8.0. American Museum of Natural History.

Further reading
  (1980): Studies on the Papuan Attidae (Araneae): Furculattus maxillosus gen. et sp. n. Folia ent. hung. 41: 25-27.
  &  (1986): Diolenius minotaurus sp. nov., a remarkable horned jumping spider from Papua New Guinea (Araneae: Salticidae). J. nat. Hist. 20: 1211-1220.
  (2003): On remarkable jumping spiders (Araneae: Salticidae) from Papua New Guinea. Folia entomologica hungarica 64: 41-58. PDF (description and pictures)
  (2004): Rewizja  taksonomiczna grupy Dioleniae (Araneae: Salticidae). PhD Thesis in Akademia Podlaska, Siedlce, Poland. ("A revision of the group Diolenieae (Araneae: Salticidae)"; in polish)

External links
 Photographs of F. maxillosus

Salticidae
Monotypic Salticidae genera